Courtland Craig Gillen (July 3, 1880 – September 1, 1954) was an American lawyer and jurist who served one term as a U.S. Representative from Indiana from 1931 to 1933.

Biography 
Courtland Craig Gillen was born on July 3, 1880, in Roachdale, Indiana. Gillen attended the rural schools. After graduating from Fincastle High School in 1897. He taught at common schools and a high school from 1897 to 1904. From 1901-1903, he attended De Pauw University at Greencastle, Indiana and later graduated from the law of department of the predecessor of what is now known as the Indiana University Robert H. McKinney School of Law in 1905. In 1904 he was admitted to the bar.

Career
Gillen commenced a law practice in Greencastle, Indiana. He later served as county attorney from 1909-1914, and as a prosecuting attorney of the sixty-fourth judicial circuit in 1917 and 1918. He also served as delegate to the Democratic State convention in 1924. He was a member of the Gillen & Lyon law firm.

Congress
Gillen was elected as a Democrat to the Seventy-second Congress (March 4, 1931 – March 3, 1933). He was an unsuccessful candidate for renomination in 1932.

Later career
Gillen was elected judge of the sixty-fourth judicial circuit (Putnam Circuit Court) in 1934 and served from January 1, 1935, until his resignation on April 15, 1939. After, he resumed the private practice of law.

Personal life
Gillen married and had three children, Mary Elizabeth, Rachel and Wayne.

Gillen died on September 1, 1954, in Greencastle, Indiana. He was interred in Forest Hill Cemetery in Greencastle.

References

1880 births
1954 deaths
Indiana University Robert H. McKinney School of Law alumni
DePauw University alumni
Democratic Party members of the United States House of Representatives from Indiana
People from Putnam County, Indiana
People from Greencastle, Indiana
20th-century American politicians